Mzoxolo Dyantyi (born 10 October 1985 in Port Elizabeth) is a South African rugby union player, who most recently played with the . His regular position is scrum-half.

Career

Griffons

SWD Eagles

He remained a bit-part player for the Eagles for the next few seasons, only making twenty appearances in a five-year period between 2007 and 2011. He became more involved in first team affairs in 2012, however, making twenty appearances in 2012 – in both the Vodacom Cup and Currie Cup competitions – and a further fifteen appearances in 2013. He was also contracted by the Eagles for 2014.

References

1985 births
Living people
Rugby union players from Port Elizabeth
Xhosa people
South African rugby union players
Griffons (rugby union) players
SWD Eagles players
Rugby union scrum-halves